A Shot of Whiskey and a Prayer is the second album by Danni Leigh. Two of its tracks released as singles and rose to relatively low positions on the Billboard country charts: "I Don't Feel That Way Anymore" was at 56, and "Honey I Do" was at 59.

Track listing
"Chain Gang" (Dennis Morgan, S. Allen Davis, Bobby Lee Springfield) – 2:38
"Longnecks, Cigarettes" (Robin Lee Bruce, Danni Leigh) – 2:39
"Trying to Get Over You" (Paul Kennerley) – 2:57
"What'cha Gonna Do?" (Kevin Welch) – 4:35
"Shiver of Lonesome" (Leslie Satcher, Wynn Varble) – 3:36
"Honey I Do" (Stacy Dean Campbell, Al Anderson) – 2:47
"Little Things" (Doug Swander, Leigh) – 2:40
"Can't Build a Better Love" (Matthew Barnes, Jann Browne, Duane Jarvis) – 3:59
"I Don't Feel That Way Anymore" (Charlie Robison) – 3:32
"Back in Your Arms Again" (John Hartford) – 3:44
"Cruel Heart" (Andy Byrd, Leigh) – 3:00

Personnel
 Richard Bennett - acoustic guitar, electric guitar, percussion
 John Catchings - cello
 Emory Gordy Jr. - bass guitar
 Kenny Greenberg - acoustic guitar, electric guitar
 Tony Harrell - piano
 Mike Henderson - electric guitar
 Tim Hensley - backing vocals
 Steve Hinson - steel guitar, lap steel guitar
 Butch Lee - Hammond organ, percussion
 Danni Leigh - percussion, lead vocals, backing vocals
 Carmella Ramsey - backing vocals
 Leslie Satcher - backing vocals
 Joe Spivey - fiddle
 Harry Stinson - backing vocals
 Kevin Welch - backing vocals
 Casey Wood - percussion
 Craig Wright - drums

References

Danni Leigh albums
2001 albums
Monument Records albums
Albums produced by Emory Gordy Jr.
Albums produced by Richard Bennett (guitarist)